Mark Sloan (born 1957) is an American artist, curator, author, and museum director.

Life and work

Mark Sloan was born in Durham, North Carolina, and grew up in Chapel Hill, North Carolina. Sloan holds a B.A. in Interdisciplinary Studies from the University of Richmond (1980) and a Master of Fine Arts degree from Virginia Commonwealth University (1984).

As an artist, Sloan's work has been exhibited at the Grand Palais in Paris; the Photographic Resource Center at Boston University; Southeastern Center for Contemporary Art in Winston-Salem, North Carolina; the Harvard Museum of Natural History; the American Philosophical Society in Philadelphia; the High Museum in Atlanta; and the United States National Academy of Sciences.

Sloan has been an arts administrator since the mid-1980s, directing two national, non-profit artists' organizations and two university art galleries. He was Executive Director of The Light Factory in Charlotte, North Carolina (1985–86); and Associate Director of San Francisco Camerawork in California (1986–89). He was Director of the Roland Gibson Gallery at the State University of New York at Potsdam from 1992 until 1994. He was the Director and Chief Curator of the Halsey Institute of Contemporary Art at the College of Charleston School of the Arts in Charleston, South Carolina from 1994 to 2020. The Halsey Institute was named for local abstract artist William Melton Halsey upon his retirement from teaching at the College of Charleston. Sloan was Consulting Curator for the art collection at the Medical University of South Carolina from 2005 until 2013. In 2012 the Halsey Institute of Contemporary Art, with special recognition to Mark Sloan, received the Elizabeth O'Neill Verner Governor’s Award for the Arts, the highest award given in South Carolina for the arts.

As a curator, Sloan has produced several hundred exhibitions of contemporary art, most of which highlight the work of under-known artists. Many of these exhibitions have traveled nationally and several internationally. These exhibitions, with their attendant publications, videos, and other documentation have increased the visibility of emerging and mid-career artists, many of whom have gone on to become contemporary art mainstays.

An active grant-writer who secures funding from major foundations, government agencies, and private donors, Sloan's efforts bring international artists to the United States for residencies and exhibitions. His curatorial efforts extend beyond the boundaries of his institutional affiliations. He has curated international exhibits in collaboration with Clemson University's architecture students.  Traveling exhibitions have appeared at the High Museum in Atlanta, Georgia; Yerba Buena Center for the Arts in San Francisco, California; Presentation House Gallery, in Vancouver, British Columbia; the Musée Art Brut, Lausanne, Switzerland; Kyoto University of Art and Design; and the American Visionary Art Museum in Baltimore, Maryland.  In 2009, Sloan curated the "largest collection of original, contemporary South Carolina art on permanent display" at Ashley River Tower, a hospital at the Medical University of South Carolina. The hospital exhibits 873 original works by 54 contemporary South Carolina artists; funding for the project came from private donations.

Sloan has authored or co-authored twenty-one books on subjects as various as Russian conceptual art, early 20th century circus life, and the Harvard Museum of Natural History. Several of his books document circus and sideshow history through photography and anecdote. Their titles reflect the hyperbole of the circus: Hoaxes, Humbugs, and Spectacles: Astonishing Photographs of Smelt Wrestlers, Human Projectiles, Giant Hailstones, Contortionists, Elephant Impersonators, and Much, Much, More!; Dear Mr. Ripley: A Compendium of Curioddities from the Believe It or Not Archives; and Wild, Weird, and Wonderful: The American Circus 1901–1927, as Seen by F.W. Glasier, Photographer are examples. With Dear Mr. Ripley, Sloan and his co-authors Roger Manley and Michelle Van Parys were given "privileged access" to all of the correspondence sent to Robert Ripley during his worklife (1918–1948).  This book appeared in US, UK, and Japanese editions.

Sloan and frequent collaborator Roger Manley have produced a number of exhibitions and book projects, including Self-Made Worlds: Visionary Folk Art Environments in 1997.  The resulting book and traveling exhibition were produced by Aperture.

Sloan's 2018 book Southbound: Photographs of and about the New South, co-edited with Mark Long, documents the traveling exhibit with the same title, and was recognized by the J. M. Kaplan fund with the 2019 Alice Award for a "richly illustrated book that makes a valuable contribution to its field and demonstrates high standards of production."

Sloan's photographs and books have inspired artists in other media. Sara Gruen credits his book Wild, Weird, and Wonderful as inspiration for her novel Water for Elephants.  Costumes and backgrounds for the 2010 film came from the book as well. Choreographer Twyla Tharp used Wild, Weird, and Wonderful as inspiration for the sets and costumes of her Broadway production of the musical The Times They Are a-Changin'.

Sloan's assemblage photographs illustrate Rarest of the Rare: Stories Behind the Treasures at the Harvard Museum of Natural History, with writer Nancy Pick and a foreword by E.O. Wilson. This was reviewed by NPR and selected as one of the top science books of 2004 by Discover magazine. Wired showed Sloan's photography in conjunction with an exhibit at National Academy of Sciences in Washington, D.C.  Sloan has written for DoubleTake magazine, Mexico’s Luna Cornea, and has been a regional field editor for the College Art Association.  He has written numerous catalog essays on contemporary art.

Sloan taught at the State University of New York at Potsdam, and was a professor at the College of Charleston, from 1994 to 2020, where he offered courses in Museum Studies and special topics courses in the Honors College.

Mark Sloan is currently an independent art and publishing consultant working under the name Curioso. He lives with his wife, photographer Michelle Van Parys, in Chapel Hill, North Carolina.

Books
Infra / Ultra: The Notebooks of Don ZanFagna.  Edited by Mark Sloan, Essays by Kirsten Moran, Mark Sloan, and Linda Weintraub. Charleston, South Carolina: Halsey Institute of Contemporary Art, College of Charleston, School of the Arts, .
(2018) Southbound: Photographs of and about the New South: A project of the Halsey Institute of Contemporary Art, Mark Sloan, Mark Long, Nikky Finney, Eleanor Heartney, William R Ferris, John T Edge, Rick Bunch; Halsey Institute of Contemporary Art; City Gallery at Waterfront Park (Charleston, S.C.), .
(2018) Carrion cheer. A faunistic tragedy by Böhler & Orendt with a soundscape by Ingmar Saal, Werner Meyer, Mark Sloan, Vienna: Verlag für Moderne Kunst, .
(2017) Visible man: Fahamu Pecou, Fahamu Pecou, Mark Sloan, Halsey Institute of Contemporary Art, Mary Elizabeth Dee Shaw Gallery, University of New Hampshire Museum of Art .
(2016) Sons & Father, John McWilliams, Dave Wofford, Ann Marie Kennedy, Mark Sloan, Halsey Institute of Contemporary Art, Theo Davis Printing, [Columbia, South Carolina]: Halsey Institute of Contemporary Art.
(2016) Jiha Moon: Double welcome, most everyone's mad here, Jiha Moon, Amy G Moorefield, Lilly Wei, Rachel Reese, M arkSloan, Halsey Institute of Contemporary Art, Taubman Museum of Art, Charleston, South Carolina: Halsey Institute of Contemporary Art at the College of Charleston; Roanoke, Virginia; in association with the Taubman Museum of Art, . 
(2015) Something to take my place: The art of Lonnie Holley, Edited by Mark Sloan, essays by Bernard L. Herman, Theodore Rosengarten, Mark Sloan, Leslie Umberger, Charleston, South Carolina: Halsey Institute of Contemporary Art, College of Charleston, School of the Arts, .
(2014) Ruth Marten – The Unvarnished Truth: Works 2007–2013, Essays by Franz and Nadia van der Grinten, Rachel Guthrie, John Marchant, and Mark Sloan. Co-published by Charleston: Halsey Institute of Contemporary Art and Cologne: Van der Grinten Gallery.  Distributed by the Halsey Institute of Contemporary Art, .  
(2013) Renee Stout: Tales of the Conjure Woman, essays by Mark Sloan, Andrea Barnwell Brownlee, and Kevin Young. Artist interview by Ade Offunyin.  Charleston: Halsey Institute of Contemporary Art. Distributed by University of South Carolina Press, .  
(2012) The Pulse Dome Project: Art & Design by Don ZanFagna, essay by Mark Sloan. Charleston: Halsey Institute of Contemporary Art.  Distributed by the Halsey Institute of Contemporary Art, .
(2012) The Paternal Suit: Heirlooms from the F. Scott Hess Family Foundation, edited by Mark Sloan, with an essay by Bella Menteur. Text by F. Scott Hess. Charleston: Halsey Institute of Contemporary Art, Distributed by D.A.P., .
(2012) Return to the Sea: Saltworks of Yamamoto Motoi, Charleston: Halsey Institute of Contemporary Art, .
(2012)  Aggie Zed: Keeper’s Keep, Charleston: Halsey Institute of Contemporary Art, .
 (2009) Aldwyth: Work v. / Work n. —Collage and Assemblage 1991–2009,  Charleston: Halsey Institute of Contemporary Art, .
(2007) Force of Nature: Site Installations by Ten Japanese Artists, with Brad Thomas. Charleston, S.C.: Halsey Institute of Contemporary Art; Davidson, N.C.: Van Every/Smith Galleries. .
(2004) Rarest of the Rare: Stories Behind the Treasures at the Harvard Museum of Natural History, (photographer) with writer Nancy Pick and a foreword by E.O. Wilson. New York: HarperResource. .
(2002) Wild, Weird, and Wonderful: The American Circus 1901–1927 as Seen by F. W. Glasier, Photographer New York: Quantuck Lane .
(1997) Self-Made Worlds: Visionary Folk Art Environments, with Roger Manley. Aperture .
(1993) Dear Mr. Ripley: A Compendium of Curioddities from the Believe It or Not Archives, with Roger Manley and Michelle Van Parys, Bulfinch Press/Little, Brown. .  Also published in United Kingdom and Japan.
(1993) PHOTOGLYPHS: Rimma Gerlovina and Valeriy Gerlovin New Orleans Museum of Art .
(1990) Hoaxes, Humbugs, and Spectacles: Astonishing Photographs of Smelt Wrestlers, Human Projectiles, Giant Hailstones, Contortionists, Elephant Impersonators, and Much, Much, More! with Roger Manley and Michelle Van Parys, Villard Books/Random House. .

Featured artists
Lonnie Holley, Katrina Andry, Alyson Shotz, Jasper Johns, Shepard Fairey, Fahamu Pecou, Jennifer Wen Ma, Eames Demetrious, Lesley Dill, Renee Stout, Pat Potter, Jumaadi, Yaakov Israel, Kathleen Robbins, Hung Liu, Juan Logan, Shimon Attie, Tanja Softic, Nick Cave, William Wegman, Edward Burtynsky, Emmet Gowin, Duane Michals, St. EOM (Pasaquan), Georgia Blizzard, Gay Outlaw, Pinky Bass, David Maisel, Leon Golub, David Stern, Susanna Coffey, Garth Evans, Oriane Stender, Mr. Imagination, Regina Frank, E.H. Sorrells Adewale, Quashie, The Art Guys, Jerome Meadows, Kevin Kelley, Volker Seding, Deborah Luster, Motoi Yamamoto, Simon Norfolk, Gideon Bok, Sumakshi Singh, Paola Cabal, Rimma Gerlovina and Valeriy Gerlovin, Jerry Uelsmann, Maggie Taylor, Evon Streetman, Larry Burrows, Craig Barber, Rikuo Ueda, Richard McMahan, Leslie Wayne, Ruth Marten, Sonya Clark, Loren Schwerd, Louis St. Lewis, Kendall Messick, Tiebena Dagnogo, Phyllis Galembo, Aldwyth, Talia Greene, and Althea Murphy-Price.

References

External links
Curioso
Halsey Institute of Contemporary Art
National Endowment of the Arts Spotlight on Halsey Institute of Contemporary Art, December 2014
Contemporary Carolina Collection at Ashley River Tower, Medical University of South Carolina
Palmetto Portraits Project
Elizabeth O'Neill Verner Award 2012 Recipients

American art curators
American photographers
American arts administrators
American contemporary artists
1957 births
Living people
People from Chapel Hill, North Carolina
University of Richmond alumni
Virginia Commonwealth University alumni
State University of New York at Potsdam faculty
College of Charleston faculty